Madame Web is an upcoming American superhero film based on the Marvel Comics character of the same name, produced by Columbia Pictures and Di Bonaventura Pictures. Distributed by Sony Pictures Releasing, it is intended to be the sixth film in Sony's Spider-Man Universe (SSU). The film is being directed by S. J. Clarkson from a screenplay by Burk Sharpless and Matt Sazama, and stars Dakota Johnson in the title role, alongside Sydney Sweeney.

Sony began development on a Madame Web film for its shared universe by September 2019, with Sharpless and Sazama hired to write a script. Clarkson joined the project in May 2020, and Johnson was cast in early 2022, followed by additional castings in the following months. Filming began in mid-July 2022, occurring in Boston and throughout Massachusetts until that September, before shooting in New York City by mid-October, and wrapped before the end of the year.

Madame Web is scheduled to be released in the United States on February 16, 2024.

Cast 
 Dakota Johnson as Madame Web: a clairvoyant whose psychic abilities allow her to see within the "spider world"
 Sydney Sweeney as Julia Carpenter

Additionally, Celeste O'Connor, Isabela Merced, Tahar Rahim, Emma Roberts, Mike Epps, Adam Scott, and Zosia Mamet have been cast in undisclosed roles.

Production

Development 
After their work on the Marvel Comics-based film Morbius (2022), part of Sony's Spider-Man Universe (SSU), Sony Pictures hired Matt Sazama and Burk Sharpless in September 2019 to write a script centered around the Marvel character Madame Web. Sony's executive vice president Palak Patel was overseeing the project. Kerem Sanga had previously written a draft for the film. In May 2020, S. J. Clarkson was hired to develop and direct Sony's first female-centric Marvel film, which was reported to be Madame Web. The studio was looking to attach a prominent actress such as Charlize Theron or Amy Adams to the project, before hiring a new writer to further develop the film with her in mind. After meeting with several "A-listers" for the title role, Sony narrowed their shortlist during December 2021 and January 2022. Dakota Johnson became the frontrunner by the end of 2021, and was in talks to star as Madame Web by early February. Clarkson was confirmed to be directing Madame Web at that time. In March, Sydney Sweeney was cast in the film alongside Johnson. Justin Kroll of Deadline Hollywood described the project as being "Sony's version of Doctor Strange" due to Madame Web's comic book abilities, though he noted that the film could be departing from the source material since the comics version of Madame Web is an elderly woman, named Cassandra Webb, connected to a life-support system that looks like a spider web. Kroll noted because of this that the film reportedly could "turn into something else". Grant Hermanns of Screen Rant noted speculation on whether Johnson was playing Cassandra Webb or the younger Julia Carpenter, who was the second character in the comics to be known as Madame Web. A month later, Sony gave Madame Web a release date of July 7, 2023, and confirmed Johnson and Sweeney would star in the film. Di Bonaventura Pictures co-produces the film alongside Columbia Pictures, with Lorenzo di Bonaventura, Erik Howsam, and Patel serving as producers. Adam J. Merims also produces on the film.

Pre-production 
In May 2022, Sony Pictures CEO and chairman Tom Rothman stated that filming would begin "in the spring", and Celeste O'Connor was cast in the film, which was described as an origin story for the titular character. In June, Isabela Merced, Tahar Rahim, and Emma Roberts also joined the cast. Sabina Graves of Gizmodo opined that the other actresses could be portraying "more recognizable" characters such as Jessica Drew / Spider-Woman and Gwen Stacy in a "reimagining" of the Spider-Verse comic. The film had been reported to be "something else under the guise" of the Madame Web character. By then, filming was set to begin in mid-July 2022. Sweeney said she was "about to" start filming, while Johnson was training ahead of starting filming in July. Mike Epps joined the cast that month.

Filming 
Principal photography began on July 11, 2022, in the Financial District of Boston through July 14, with scenes modeling 2000s New York City, including Chinatown, Manhattan. Filming occurred using the working title Claire, with Mauro Fiore serving as cinematographer, after previously doing so for Sony's Spider-Man: No Way Home (2021). Shortly after filming started, Adam Scott joined the cast, and the film's release date was delayed to October 6, 2023. In late July, filming occurred in Allston at Kelton Street. Zosia Mamet was cast in August. Filming that month occurred in Chelsea, Massachusetts, while construction of a set in Andover, Massachusetts had also begun to stand-in for the 4-Star Diner, a comics location, and took place at baseball fields in West Andover. Filming occurred in Worcester, Massachusetts for precision driving and exterior street shots in mid-September to last for three days, on various street locations, using the working titles Claire and Peru. At that time, the release was further delayed to February 16, 2024. Filming was also set to take place in other areas in the South Shore of Massachusetts, including a former hangar of the Naval Air Station South Weymouth. Filming in Massachusetts, particularly for the Boston unit, lasted for three months until September 2022. The production then moved to New York City by October 11, occurring at Grand Central Station, and Sweeney completed filming her scenes by October 18 after a three and a half month shoot. Filming was completed before the end of the year, and was confirmed to have wrapped in mid-January 2023. Filming was also expected to occur in Mexico.

Post-production 
William Hoy serves as the editor of the film. In March 2023, it was reported that Sweeney would be portraying Julia Carpenter.

Release 
Madame Web is scheduled to be theatrically released in the United States on February 16, 2024, in IMAX. It was previously scheduled for July 7, 2023, and then on October 6, 2023.

In December 2022, Sony signed a long-term deal with the Canadian-based streaming service Crave for their films starting in April 2023, following the films' theatrical and home media windows. Crave signed for the "pay-one" window streaming rights, which included Madame Web.

References

External links 
 

2020s American films
2020s English-language films
2020s superhero films

2024 science fiction action films
American science fiction action films
American superhero films
Columbia Pictures films
Di Bonaventura Pictures films
Films directed by S. J. Clarkson
Films produced by Lorenzo di Bonaventura
Films shot in Boston
Films shot in Massachusetts

Films shot in New York City
Films with screenplays by Matt Sazama and Burk Sharpless
IMAX films

Sony's Spider-Man Universe films
Superheroine films
Upcoming directorial debut films